Carlos de Menezes Júnior (born 25 April 1998), commonly known as Cacá, is a Brazilian professional footballer who plays for Tokushima Vortis as a central defender.

Club career
Born in Visconde do Rio Branco, Minas Gerais, Cacá arrived at the youth setup of Cruzeiro in June 2014. Progressing through the youth ranks, he went on to captain the under-20 side in their Campeonato Mineiro under-20 triumph in 2018.

Promoted to the first team in March 2018, Cacá made his professional – and Série A debut on 14 October, playing the whole 90 minutes of a 2–0 away defeat against Vasco da Gama. Three days later, he was an unused substitute in the second leg of the Copa do Brasil Finals, with his side defeating Corinthians by 2–1.

Initially a backup to Dedé and Léo during the 2019 Campeonato Mineiro, Cacá started to feature more regularly during the league. He scored his first senior goal on 31 October of that year, netting the opener in a 2–0 away success over Botafogo, and finished the campaign with 20 league appearances as his side suffered a first-ever relegation.

On 6 January 2020, Cacá renewed his contract with Cruzeiro until December 2022.

On February 14, 2021, Cacá signed with J1 League side Tokushima Vortis.

Career statistics

Honours
Cruzeiro
Copa do Brasil: 2018
Campeonato Mineiro: 2018, 2019

References

External links

1999 births
Living people
Sportspeople from Minas Gerais
Brazilian footballers
Association football defenders
Campeonato Brasileiro Série A players
Campeonato Brasileiro Série B players
J1 League players
Cruzeiro Esporte Clube players
Tokushima Vortis players